Richard Casey Merrill (born July 16, 1957) is a former professional American football defensive end in the National Football League for the Green Bay Packers (1979–1982), New York Giants (1983–1986) and the New Orleans Saints in the 1986 season.  Born in Oakland, California, he played college football at the University of California at Davis and was drafted in the fifth round of the 1979 NFL Draft.

Professional career
Merrill spent nine seasons in professional football as a defensive end and outside linebacker.  Blessed with exceptional speed (4.65 40 yard dash), Merrill became the first designated pass rusher in the NFL to line up and pass rush from both defensive line and linebacker positions. In the 1981 season Merrill had 7 sacks and 3 fumble recoveries for the Green Bay Packers.  In the strike shortened 1982 season Casey had 4 sacks.  In 1984 with the New York Giants, Merrill led all Giant defensive lineman with 11 sacks, including 1 in the playoffs against the San Francisco 49ers bringing Joe Montana down with a crushing hit.

After football
Merrill now works as Executive Managing Director for the Colliers International Southwest region, based in Los Angeles, California.  He is married to Nilda Merrill and they have two sons, Zach and Casey, as well as three daughters, Ella, Samantha, and Alexandrea. He lives in Bermuda Dunes, California.

References

External links
 

1957 births
Living people
American football defensive linemen
Green Bay Packers players
New Orleans Saints players
New York Giants players
UC Davis Aggies football players
People from Bermuda Dunes, California
People from Palm Desert, California
Players of American football from Oakland, California